The Citroën C3-XR is a Chinese-exclusive subcompact crossover from the Franco-Chinese joint venture Dongfeng Peugeot-Citroën.

A three-box version has been marketed from 2020 to 2021 under the name Citroën C3L.

Overview

Originally previewed by the concept Citroën C–XR during the 2014 Beijing Auto Show in April 2014, the C3-XR is derived from the Citroën C-Elysée. Citroën debuted the C3-XR on the 2014 Paris Auto Show, and released the production version in China on the 2014 Guangzhou Auto Show in November 2014.

The actual production version of the Citroën C3–XR was launched on the China car market on December 21, 2014. A special anniversary edition package for the Citroën C3–XR was available, when the joint venture of Dongfeng PSA celebrates its twenty fifth anniversary in 2017.

The special edition was sold as a package exclusively for the 134 hp 1.2 liter turbo version released in 2016. The package comes in two trim levels, including the glitter and gold trim.

Engines
During the initial release, available engines for the Citroën C3–XR are a 117 hp 1.6 liter engine and a 167 hp 1.6 liter turbo engine.

An additional engine option was added for the Citroen C3–XR in 2016. The added engine was a 1.2 litre turbocharged four cylinder petrol engine with an output of 136 hp and 230 nm, and was mated to a six speed automatic gearbox. The updated model was released to the car market in China in March 2016.

2019 facelift

The C3–XR received a facelift in 2019, featuring a restyled front fascia. The facelift was revealed on January 16, 2019, and was available in the market by March 2019. Engine options include a 1.6 litre engine, producing 117 hp, and a 1.2 litre turbo engine, producing 136 hp, both mated to either a five speed manual gearbox, and one six speed semi automatic gearbox.

This facelift failed to stop quickly decreasing sales volumes.

2021 facelift 
The C3-XR gets a second facelift in May 2021. The front of the vehicle is heavily updated, evoking the recent facelift of the C3 Aircross. The C3-XR also gets a more modern interior. It will be on sale from July 2021.

Citroën C3L (M443)

In 2020, a 4-door crossover sedan version was released, called the C3L whose design is similar in concept to the Volvo S60 Cross Country. The C3L is produced only for Chinese market at the Wuhan plant. The design incorporates numerous elements from the C3-XR, another vehicle derived from the C-Elysee. The suspension is raised and the bodywork has plastic protections in the bumpers and along the side. The engine is a 1.2-liter VTi three-cylinder producing 114 hp and 140 lb-ft (190 Nm) of torque and mated to a six-speed Aisin automatic transmission.

Notes

References 

Mini sport utility vehicles
C3-XR
Cars introduced in 2012
Cars of China
2010s cars